Rian Sukmawan (21 November 1985 – 27 February 2016) was a professional badminton player from Indonesia.

Career 
Sukmawan was a doubles specialist. In 2006, he won the men's doubles at the Dutch and New Zealand Opens with fellow countryman Eng Hian. In 2007, he won the Dutch Open again with partner Yonathan Suryatama Dasuki.

Death 
Rian Sukmawan died on 27 February 2016 of a heart attack after playing in an exhibition match in Semarang with some former players, including Tri Kusharjanto. According to Kusharjanto, Sukmawan went outside for some rest before a security guard found him laying on a bench outside the arena alone and asking for help. He was rushed to hospital, but was declared dead on arrival.

Achievements

Asian Junior Championships 
Boys' doubles

BWF Superseries 
The BWF Superseries, launched on 14 December 2006 and implemented in 2007, is a series of elite badminton tournaments, sanctioned by Badminton World Federation (BWF). BWF Superseries has two level such as Superseries and Superseries Premier. A season of Superseries features twelve tournaments around the world, which introduced since 2011, with successful players invited to the Superseries Finals held at the year end.

Men's doubles

  BWF Superseries Finals tournament
  BWF Superseries Premier tournament
  BWF Superseries tournament

BWF Grand Prix 
The BWF Grand Prix has two levels, the BWF Grand Prix and Grand Prix Gold. It is a series of badminton tournaments sanctioned by the Badminton World Federation (BWF) since 2007. The World Badminton Grand Prix sanctioned by International Badminton Federation (IBF) since 1983.

Men's doubles

  BWF Grand Prix Gold tournament
  BWF & IBF Grand Prix tournament

BWF International Challenge/Series 
Men's doubles

  BWF International Challenge tournament
  BWF International Series tournament

Performance timeline

National team 
 Junior level

 Senior level

Individual competitions 
 Junior level

 Senior level

References 

1985 births
2016 deaths
People from Semarang
Sportspeople from Central Java
Indonesian male badminton players
21st-century Indonesian people